The Airdrome Taube is an American amateur-built aircraft, designed and produced by Airdrome Aeroplanes, of Holden, Missouri. The aircraft is supplied as a kit for amateur construction.

The aircraft is a 3/4 scale replica of the First World War German Etrich Taube scout/observation/bomber, built from modern materials and powered by modern engines.

Design and development
The Airdrome Taube features a mid-wing cable-braced monoplane layout with an inverted "V" kingpost, a two-seat open cockpit, fixed conventional landing gear and a single engine in tractor configuration.

The aircraft is made from bolted-together aluminum tubing, with its flying surfaces covered in doped aircraft fabric. The standard engine is a  Volkswagen air-cooled engine four stroke engine. Building time from the factory-supplied kit is estimated at 500 hours by the manufacturer.

Operational history
One example had been completed by December 2011.

Specifications (Taube)

References

Homebuilt aircraft
Single-engined tractor aircraft